Ian Elliot (Aug 12, 1945 – July 3, 2021) was a modern Scottish artist known for abstract expressionist painting.

Early life
Ian Scott Elliot was born on August 12, 1946 in Glasgow, Scotland. He attended the Glasgow School of Art (GSA) from 1964-1968. After graduating from GSA he attended Jordanhill College for teacher training 1969-1969. He worked as the Head of Art & Design in King's Park Secondary School for 16 years. He left teaching 1997 to focus on the development of his artistic career.

Artistic career
Inspired by travel throughout his homeland of Scotland, Italy, France, and the island of Mallorca, Ian Elliot’s expressive oil on canvas artwork is known for incorporating the strong and vibrant colors of the Mediterranean with modern impressionist movement, rhythm and pattern.

In 2002 A Place in the Sun (British TV series) followed Ian Elliot as he travelled from Scotland to Calvià Mallorca and broadcast him painting "Calvia" - oil on canvass in January 2003. A long-standing artist member of the Paisley Art Insitiute, he was a finalist in the 2003 International Artist magazine global landscape competition. From 2012, Ian Elliot’s name was listed in the Morven Press’s ‘Who’s Who In Art. In 2013, International Artist magazine featured Ian Elliot in a ten page in-depth article illustrating his working process on the painting Rendezvous, Mallorca. And in 2016 was featured in Pratique des Arts n° 135. He exhibited at solo and joint exhibitions throughout his career.

Gallery

Exhibitions

Solo
 2008, 2012, 2014: Ian Elliot, The Gatehouse gallery 
 2016: Ian Elliot, 
 2021: Ian Elliot, Scotland Art 
 Framework gallery, Troon 
 Rowan gallery, Helensburgh 
 Torquhoun gallery, Tarves

Group
 2013: 
 2016: Tis the Season!, Scotland Art
 2017: Summer Breeze, Thistle Gallery: Contemporary Scottish Art
 2017: Elliot, McWhinnie, 
 2018: Turning over a New Leaf, Thistle Gallery: Contemporary Scottish Art
 2018: Elliot, McWhinnie, 
 2019: Winter exhibition, Thistle Gallery: Contemporary Scottish Art
 2020, 2021: Winter exhibition, Scotland Art

Print
 2002: Different strokes, Glasgow South & Eastwood Extra
 2004: World-wide fame, Glasgow Times
 2007: Med in Scotland, The Scotsman
 2008: Market-ing his art, Glasgow South & Eastwood Extra
 2013: Travel Opens the Eyes… and the Mind – 10 page feature, International Artist magazine
 2016: July (UK edition), Vogue (magazine)
 2017: 4 page feature 2017, Pratique des Arts n° 135

References

1945 births
2021 deaths
People from Glasgow
20th-century Scottish painters
Scottish male painters
Artists from Glasgow
21st-century Scottish painters
Alumni of the Glasgow School of Art